List of the islands of the Federated States of Micronesia, in the central and western Caroline Islands Archipelago of the Western Pacific Ocean. The islands are within the Micronesia cultural and ecological region of Oceania.

There are 607 islands and islets in the Federated States of Micronesia.

List
Not every individual island (in italics) is listed here; if applicable, they are grouped by atoll (in plain text) and island group (in boldface).

 Chuuk Atoll
 Eauripik
 Elato
 Falalop
 Faraulep
 Fayu Atoll
 Gaferut
Hall Islands
 Nomwin
 Murilo
 Ifalik
 Kapingamarangi
 Kosrae
 Kuop
 Lamotrek
 Lelu Island
 Mokil Atoll
 Namonuito Atoll
Nomoi Islands
 Etal Atoll
 Losap
 Lukunor
 Nama
 Namoluk
 Ngulu Atoll
 Nukuoro
 Olimarao
 Oroluk Atoll
 Pakin Atoll
 Piagailoe
 Pingelap
 Poluwat
 Pulap
 Sapwuahfik
 Satawal
 Satawan
Senyavin Islands
 Ant Atoll
 Pakin Atoll
 Pohnpei
 Sorol
 Ulithi
 Woleai
 Yap

See also
List of islands of Palau — in the western Caroline Islands Archipelago.
Micronesia

References

 
Islands
Micronesia